Golgotha is a 1935 French film about the death of Jesus Christ, released in English-speaking countries as Behold the Man. The film was directed by Julien Duvivier, and stars Harry Baur as Herod, Jean Gabin as Pontius Pilate, and Robert Le Vigan plays Jesus of Nazareth.

In 1935, the film opened in France, and in 1937 in United States and played throughout Europe. However, the British Board of Film Censors "would not allow British eyes to see it."

Le Vigan's performance marks the first direct portrayal of Christ in a sound film. For the most part, Jesus is shown from a respectful distance as was also the case in Ben-Hur, Quo Vadis, or The Robe, but there are also a few closer shots and even close-ups.

The National Board of Review named the film the sixth best foreign film of 1937. The score for the movie was composed by French composer Jacques Ibert.

Cast
Harry Baur ...  Herod Antipas 
Jean Gabin ...  Pontius Pilate 
Robert Le Vigan ...  Jesus Christ 
Charles Granval ...  Caiaphas
 ...  Annas (as Andre Bacque) 
 ...  Peter (as Hubert Prelier) 
Lucas Gridoux ...  Judas 
Edmond Van Daële ...  Gerson (as Van Daele) 
Edwige Feuillère ...  Claudia Procula 
...  Mary
 ...  Joseph of Arimathea (as Chabrier) 
Georges Saillard ...  Un Sanhédrite (as Saillard) 
 ...  Le scribe 
Victor Vina ...  Un Sanhédrite 
 ...  Un Sanhédrite (as Viguier)

References

External links 

1935 films
1930s French-language films
French black-and-white films
Films directed by Julien Duvivier
Film portrayals of Jesus' death and resurrection
Films scored by Jacques Ibert
French adventure drama films
1930s adventure drama films
Cultural depictions of Pontius Pilate
1935 drama films
Films originally rejected by the British Board of Film Classification
1930s French films